Highland Lakes is a neighborhood of Ojus, a CDP and unincorporated community in Miami-Dade County, Florida, United States.

Geography

External links
 Sky Lake - Highland Lakes Area Homeowners Association

References

Unincorporated communities in Miami-Dade County, Florida
Unincorporated communities in Florida